La Blanche Hermine (French for "The White Ermine") is a 1970 song by French singer Gilles Servat with lyrics affirming the Breton identity. It was first published on the eponymous album from 1971, which was certified gold. Calling for an armed uprising against the French, the song quickly became an anthem in Brittany and popular in all of France.

Song 

The song is a rhymed seven-syllable laisse. The ermine from the title was the heraldic animal of the Duchy of Brittany, a sovereign feudal state.

The lyrics are about a villager who meets "a band of sailors, workers and peasants" who are going to ambush the "Franks" and win their freedom. He joins them and sings about the plight of his wife, visiting her and children in secret during the war, and possibly dying for his homeland.

The chorus mentions the fortresses of Fougères and Clisson, which seems to point to the feudal wars of the Bretons against the French at the border of the duchy. However, the rebels' "charged guns" indicate a more recent past; therefore, the only plausible period is believed to be the Chouannerie war of the French Revolution, popularized by La Villemarqué in Barzaz Breiz. The song is often found in collections dedicated to the Chouans, the War in the Vendée, and the Legitimists, but also in general collections of military songs.

Background 

Servat wrote the song in 1970, at the age of 25, while living in Paris. The day before, he had heard an Irish song about the departure of a guerilla fighter with a bullet in his pocket. That same evening, he sang it for the first time at Ti Jos, a Breton restaurant at Montparnasse, where he made a living by begging. The words and the protest energy of the song made a big impression on the Bretons, which surprised the artist himself.

After the protests of May 68, Brittany had gone through an identity crisis and an economic transition. Servat wrote the warrior song to make the Bretons aware of their plight and inspire an uprising:

Bibliography in French 
 Daniel Chatelain and Pierre Tafini, Qu'est ce qui fait courir les autonomistes ?, Stock, 1976
 Erwan Chartier, Gilles Servat. Portrait, Blanc Silex, 2004
 Guy Millière, Gilles Servat, poésie et chansons, Seghers, 1975

References  

The above information is taken from the French Wikipedia article on the subject.

Breton music
French music
1971 songs